The Adulteress may refer to:
 The Adulteress (1946 film), a 1946 Italian film
 The Adulteress (1963 film), a 1963 film starring Peter Yang
 The Adulteress (1973 film), a 1973 film directed by Norbert Meisel
 The Adultress, a song from the album Pretenders II by The Pretenders

See also

Adultery (disambiguation)